The Pinaka (pínāka) is the celestial bow of the Hindu destroyer deity, Shiva. In popular legend, he is believed to have employed this bow in his avatar as Tripurantaka to annihilate the three cities of Mayasura, known as Tripura. The weapon is the origin of one of Shiva's epithets, Pinakapani, literally meaning, 'the wielder of the Pinaka'.

In Literature 
In the Shiva Purana, Shiva employed the Pinaka in his duel against Ganesha, who had been appointed to stand guard while his mother Parvati bathed.

In the Harivamsa Purana, when the Prajapati Daksha performed a yajna for the gods, his ceremony was obstructed by Shiva and a human incarnation of Nandi, who wielded the Pinaka. Hari (Vishnu) stood to confront him, accompanied by the adityas and the vasus. Shiva struck Hari on his breast, who countered by grabbing his assailant's throat. When he strung his own bow Sharanga, the mountain Meru trembled. Infuriated, Nandi raised the Pinaka and struck Hari on the head, who stupefied the man with a smile and stood firm, allowing the yajna to resume.

In the Padma Purana, Shiva employed the Pinaka to combat Jalandhara:
When the Yadava forces invaded Sonitapura to rescue Aniruddha, Shiva and Kartikeya rushed to guard the city of the Shaiva asura, Bana. Krishna's Sharanga and Shiva's Pinaka were used against each other in the battle, the conflict ultimately won by Krishna.

In the Ramayana, Rama broke the Pinaka to win Princess Sita's hand in marriage during her swayamvara.

The Pinaka is sometimes considered to be the weapon Shiva employed to destroy Tripura, even though other legends state that the bow used for the destruction of the three cities was fashioned from Mount Mandara:

See also 

 Sharanga
 Vijaya
 Gandiva

References

Weapons in Hindu mythology